Creighton Tull Chaney (February10, 1906 – July12, 1973), known by his stage name Lon Chaney Jr., was an American actor known for playing Larry Talbot in the film The Wolf Man (1941) and its various crossovers, Count Alucard (Dracula spelled backward) in Son of Dracula, Frankenstein's monster in The Ghost of Frankenstein (1942), the Mummy in three pictures, and various other roles in many Universal horror films, making him a horror icon. He also portrayed Lennie Small in Of Mice and Men (1939) and supporting parts in dozens of mainstream movies, including High Noon (1952), and The Defiant Ones (1958). 

Originally referred to in films as Creighton Chaney, he was later credited as "Lon Chaney, Jr." in 1935, and after Man Made Monster (1941), beginning as early as The Wolf Man later that same year, he was almost always billed under the name of his immensely more famous father, the deceased cinema giant Lon Chaney, at the studio's insistence. Chaney had English, French, and Irish ancestry, and his career in movies and television spanned four decades, from 1931 to 1971.

Early life

Creighton Tull Chaney was born on February 10, 1906, in Oklahoma City, the son of then-stage performer Lon Chaney and Frances Cleveland Creighton, a singing stage performer who traveled in road shows across the country with Chaney. His parents' troubled marriage ended in divorce in 1913 following his mother's scandalous public suicide attempt in Los Angeles. Young Creighton lived in various homes and boarding schools until 1916, when his father (now employed in the film industry) married Hazel Hastings and could provide a stable home.

From an early age, he worked hard to avoid his famous father's shadow. In young adulthood, his father discouraged him from show business, and he attended business college and became successful in a Los Angeles appliance corporation. Creighton, who had begun working for a plumbing company, married Dorothy Hinckley, the daughter of his employer Ralph Hinckley. They had two sons: Lon Ralph Chaney and Ronald Creighton Chaney.

Creighton's life changed when his father was diagnosed with throat cancer and died on August 26, 1930, at the age of 47. Many articles and biographies over the years report that Creighton was led to believe his mother had died while he was a boy, and he only learned that she was still alive after his father's death. Creighton always maintained he had a tough childhood.

Career

As Creighton Chaney

It was only after his father's death that Chaney began to act in films, billed by his own name. He began with an uncredited bit part in the serial The Galloping Ghost (1931) and signed a contract with RKO who gave him small roles in a number of films, including Girl Crazy (1932), The Roadhouse Murder (1932), Bird of Paradise (1932), and The Most Dangerous Game (1932).

RKO gave him the starring role in a serial, The Last Frontier (1932). He got bigger film roles in Lucky Devils (1933), Son of the Border (1933), Scarlet River (1933), The Life of Vergie Winters (1934). Over at Mascot Pictures he supported John Wayne in a serial, The Three Musketeers (1933), which was later re-edited into a film entitled Desert Command (1946).

"I did every possible bit in pictures" said Chaney later. "Had to do stuntwork to live. I bulldogged steers, fell off and got knocked off cliffs, rode horses off precipices into rivers, drove prairie schooners up and down hills."

He had the lead in the independent film Sixteen Fathoms Deep (1934), and a memorable part in which his character sings in Girl o' My Dreams (1934) at Monogram. The last film he made as Creighton Chaney was The Marriage Bargain (1935) for Screencraft Productions. After this point he was billed as Lon Chaney, Jr. until 1942, when he was usually billed, at the insistence of Universal Studios, with his iconic father's name, although the "Jr." was usually added by others to distinguish the two.

As Lon Chaney Jr.
He had the lead in A Scream in the Night (1935) made for Commodore Pictures, a crime thriller. He played small roles at Paramount: Hold 'Em Yale (1935), Accent on Youth (1935) and Rose Bowl (1936). A small outfit, Ray Kirkwood Productions, gave him a lead, The Shadow of Silk Lennox (1935).

At Republic he featured alongside Gene Autry in The Singing Cowboy (1936) and The Old Corral (1937).  He was a henchman in a serial for Republic, Undersea Kingdom (1936). Universal got him to play a henchman in their serial, Ace Drummond (1937) and he was uncredited in Columbia's Killer at Large (1936). He lent his name to a cafe which was embroiled in a liquor scandal.

Chaney Jr. was the main villain in a Tom Tyler B Western, Cheyenne Rides Again (1937) and was in a serial, Secret Agent X-9 (1937).

20th Century Fox
Chaney Jr. signed a contract at 20th Century Fox and appeared in Love Is News (1937) with Tyrone Power, Midnight Taxi (1937) with Brian Donlevy, That I May Live (1937), This Is My Affair (1937) with Robert Taylor and Barbara Stanwyck, Angel's Holiday (1937), Born Reckless (1937) with Brian Donlevy, Wild and Woolly (1937) with Walter Brennan, The Lady Escapes (1937) with Gloria Stuart, Thin Ice (1937) with Tyrone Power, One Mile from Heaven (1937) with Claire Trevor, Charlie Chan on Broadway (1938), Life Begins in College (1937) with the Ritz Brothers, Wife, Doctor and Nurse (1937) with Loretta Young, Second Honeymoon (1937) with Tyrone Power and Loretta Young, Checkers (1937), Love and Hisses (1938) with Walter Winchell, City Girl (1938), Happy Landing (1938) with Ethel Merman, Sally, Irene and Mary (1938) with Fred Allen and Jimmy Durante, Mr. Moto's Gamble (1938) with Peter Lorre, Walking Down Broadway (1938) with Claire Trevor, Alexander's Ragtime Band (1938) with Tyrone Power, Josette (1938) with Don Ameche and Robert Young, Speed to Burn (1938) with Lynn Bari, Passport Husband (1938), Straight, Place and Show (1938) with the Ritz Brothers, John Ford's Submarine Patrol (1938) with Nancy Kelly, and Road Demon (1939). He was almost killed by a train while filming a bank robbery scene in Jesse James (1939). Jesse James also coincidentally featured Henry Hull, the star of Werewolf of London (1935), in a supporting role.

Chaney Jr. later made Charlie Chan in City in Darkness (1939) with Lynn Bari and Frontier Marshal (1939) with Randolph Scott and Nancy Kelly.

Of Mice and Men (1939)
Chaney Jr's only stage appearance had been as Lennie Small in a production of Of Mice and Men with Wallace Ford. He was cast in that role in the film Of Mice and Men (1939), which was produced by Hal Roach Studios. The film was Chaney Jr's first major role in a film and was a critical success for him. Chaney had a screen test for the role of Quasimodo for the remake of The Hunchback of Notre Dame (1939), a role which his father played back in 1923, but the role went to Charles Laughton.

One Million B.C
Hal Roach used him in his third-billed character role in One Million B.C. (1940) as Victor Mature's caveman father, Chaney began to be viewed as a character actor in the mold of his father. He had in fact designed a swarthy, ape-like Neanderthal make-up on himself for the film, but production decisions and union rules prevented his following through on emulating his father in that fashion. Cecil B. DeMille used him in a supporting role in North West Mounted Police (1940) and MGM used him in Billy the Kid (1941) with Robert Taylor as Billy and Brian Donlevy as Pat Garrett. That studio considered putting Chaney Jr in a remake of his father's hit He Who Gets Slapped but decided not to make it.

Universal Pictures
Universal Pictures offered Chaney Jr the lead in Man-Made Monster (1941), a science-fiction horror thriller originally written with Boris Karloff in mind.  Chaney's first horror film, it was successful enough for them to offer him a long-term contract.

Universal kept him in supporting roles for a while: a comedy Too Many Blondes (1941), a musical San Antonio Rose (1941) with Shemp Howard, a serial Riders of Death Valley (1941) featuring Noah Beery Jr., the Western Badlands of Dakota (1941) and the "Northern" North to the Klondike (1942) with Broderick Crawford.

Horror film star: The Wolf Man, The Mummy, Inner Sanctum

Chaney Jr. was then given the title role in The Wolf Man (1941) for Universal, a role which, much like Karloff's Frankenstein monster, would largely typecast Chaney as a horror film actor for the rest of his life. Universal dropped the "Jr." and billed him as "Lon Chaney" going forward within that studio, apparently to foster confusion with his father among audiences.

Chaney Jr. was now an official horror star, and Universal gave him the role of Frankenstein's monster in The Ghost of Frankenstein (1942), the first B-movie of the series, when Boris Karloff decided not to play the part again; Bela Lugosi returned in his role as Ygor and the leading lady was Evelyn Ankers. He was in a crime film, Eyes of the Underworld (1942) and the wartime shorts  Keeping Fit (1942) and What We Are Fighting For (1943).

Chaney Jr. played Kharis the Mummy in The Mummy's Tomb (1942), another hit. He was in a Western Frontier Badmen (1943), then reprised his role as the Wolf Man in Frankenstein Meets the Wolf Man (1943) with Bela Lugosi as Frankenstein's monster. The film was originally filmed with the Monster being blind but also speaking in Lugosi's distinctive "Ygor" voice but the studio cut out all references to either so that audiences were left wondering why the Monster staggered around with his arms extended in front of him, not to mention why he had lost the ability to speak since Ghost of Frankenstein, grievously damaging Lugosi's reputation.

Chaney Jr. was given the role of Dracula in Son of Dracula (1943); the film was actually about Dracula himself, who had no son in the film. This made him the only actor to portray all four of Universal's major horror characters: the Wolf Man, Frankenstein's monster, the Mummy, and Count Dracula.

After a cameo in Crazy House (1943) he was given the lead in Calling Dr. Death (1943), based on the Inner Sanctum mysteries. It kicked off another series starring Chaney, the first of which was Weird Woman (1944).

He made a second mummy movie, The Mummy's Ghost (1944) and had a support part in Cobra Woman (1944), starring Maria Montez and Ghost Catcher (1944), with the comedy team Olsen and Johnson.

Dead Man's Eyes (1944) was the third Inner Sanctum, after which he was back as the Wolf Man in House of Frankenstein (1944). The Mummy's Curse (1944) was Chaney's third and final appearance as Kharis.

He played an antagonist in the Abbott and Costello comedy Here Come the Co-Eds (1945), then made more Inner Sanctums: The Frozen Ghost (1945) with Evelyn Ankers and Strange Confession (1945) with Brenda Joyce. He returned as the Wolf Man in House of Dracula (1945), one of the last of the Universal horror cycle. Pillow of Death (1945) was the last Inner Sanctum. The Daltons Ride Again (1945) was a Western featuring Noah Beery Jr. in a supporting role.

Leaving Universal
Despite being typecast as the Wolf Man, the 6-foot 2-inch, 220-pound actor managed to carve out a secondary niche as a supporting actor and villain.

He was in a Bob Hope comedy My Favorite Brunette (1947), supported Randolph Scott in Albuquerque (1948) and had a support in The Counterfeiters (1948) and played a villain in 16 Fathoms Deep (1948) for Monogram Pictures, a remake of his 1934 film.

He reprised his Wolf Man role to great effect in Abbott and Costello Meet Frankenstein (1948) but it did not cause a notable boost to his career. In April 1948 Chaney was hospitalized after taking an overdose of sleeping pills. He recovered and played Harry Brock in a Los Angeles theatre production of Born Yesterday in 1949.

Chaney kept busy in support roles: Captain China (1950), Once a Thief (1950), Inside Straight (1951), Bride of the Gorilla (1951), Only the Valiant (1951), Behave Yourself! (1951), Flame of Araby (1952), The Bushwackers (1952), Thief of Damascus (1952), Battles of Chief Pontiac (1952) (in the title role), High Noon (1952), Springfield Rifle (1952), The Black Castle (1952) (a return to horror), Raiders of the Seven Seas (1953), A Lion Is in the Streets (1953) with James Cagney, The Boy from Oklahoma (1954), Casanova's Big Night (1954), Passion (1954), The Black Pirates (1954), Jivaro (1955), Big House, U.S.A. (1955), I Died a Thousand Times (1955), The Indian Fighter (1955), and The Black Sleep (1956)

He had a leading role in Indestructible Man (1956) then was back to support parts: Manfish (1956); a Martin and Lewis comedy, Pardners (1956); Daniel Boone, Trail Blazer (1957); The Cyclops (1957) and The Alligator People (1959).

Chaney established himself as a favorite of producer Stanley Kramer; in addition to playing a key supporting role in High Noon (1952) (starring Gary Cooper), he also appeared in Not as a Stranger (1955)—a hospital melodrama featuring Robert Mitchum and Frank Sinatra—and The Defiant Ones (1958, starring Tony Curtis and Sidney Poitier). Kramer told the press at the time that whenever a script came in with a role too difficult for most actors in Hollywood, he called Chaney.

He became quite popular with baby boomers after Universal released its back catalog of horror films to television in 1957 (Shock Theater) and Famous Monsters of Filmland magazine regularly focused on his films.

In 1957, Chaney went to Ontario, Canada, to costar in the first ever American-Canadian television production, as Chingachgook in Hawkeye and the Last of the Mohicans, suggested by James Fenimore Cooper's stories. The series ended after 39 episodes. Universal released their film biography of his father, Man of a Thousand Faces (1957), featuring a semi-fictionalized version of Creighton's life story from his birth up until his father's death. Roger Smith was cast as Creighton as a young adult.

He appeared in an episode of the western series Tombstone Territory titled "The Black Marshal from Deadwood" (1958), and appeared in numerous western series such as Rawhide. He also hosted the 13-episode television anthology series 13 Demon Street in 1959, which was created by Curt Siodmak.

1960s
In the 1960s, Chaney specialised in horror films, such as House of Terror (1960), The Devil's Messenger (1961) and The Haunted Palace (1963), replacing Boris Karloff in the last of those for Roger Corman.

He was in a Western Law of the Lawless (1963) with Dale Robertson, Face of the Screaming Werewolf (1964), Witchcraft (1964), and Stage to Thunder Rock (1964).

He starred in Jack Hill's Spider Baby, which was made in 1964 but not released until 1968 and would not attain notoriety until after Chaney's death. Then it was back to Westerns – Young Fury (1965), Black Spurs (1965), Town Tamer (1966), Johnny Reno (1967), Apache Uprising (1967), Welcome to Hard Times (1967) and Buckskin (1968). There was also horror, such as Dr. Terror's Gallery of Horrors (1967) and Hillbillys in a Haunted House (1967).

His bread-and-butter work during this decade was television – where he made guest appearances on everything from Wagon Train to The Monkees – and in a string of supporting roles in low-budget Westerns produced by A. C. Lyles for Paramount. In 1962, Chaney gained a chance to briefly play Quasimodo in a simulacrum of his father's make-up, as well as return to his roles of the Mummy and the Wolf Man on the television series Route 66 with friends Boris Karloff and Peter Lorre (Karloff wore a quickie version of the Frankenstein monster make-up toward the end of the episode).

Final films
In later years, he suffered from throat cancer and chronic heart disease among other ailments after decades of heavy drinking and smoking. In his final horror film, Dracula vs. Frankenstein (1971), directed by Al Adamson, he played Groton, Dr. Frankenstein's mute henchman. He filmed his part in the spring of 1969, and shortly thereafter performed his final film role, also for Adamson in 1969 in The Female Bunch.  Chaney had lines in The Female Bunch but his hoarse, raspy voice was virtually unrecognizable. Due to illness he retired from acting to concentrate on a book about the Chaney family legacy, A Century of Chaneys, which remains to date unpublished in any form. His grandson, Ron Chaney Jr, was working on completing this project.

Personal life
Chaney was married twice. He had two sons by his first wife, Dorothy, Lon Ralph Chaney (July 3, 1928 – May 5, 1992) and Ronald Creighton Chaney (March 18, 1930 – December 15, 1987). Dorothy divorced him in 1936 for drinking too much and being "sullen".  He married Patsy Beck in 1937. 

Chaney was well liked by some co-workers – "sweet" is the adjective that most commonly emerges from those who acted with, and liked him – yet he was capable of intense dislikes. For instance, he and frequent co-star Evelyn Ankers did not get along at all. He was also known to befriend younger actors and stand up for older ones whom he felt were belittled by the studios. One example was William Farnum, a major silent star who played a small role in The Mummy's Curse. According to co-star Peter Coe, Chaney demanded that Farnum be given his own chair on the set and be treated with respect, or else he would walk off the picture.

Chaney had run-ins with actor Frank Reicher (whom he nearly strangled on camera in The Mummy's Ghost) and director Robert Siodmak (over whose head Chaney broke a vase). Actor Robert Stack claimed in his 1980 autobiography that Chaney and drinking buddy Broderick Crawford were known as "the monsters" around the Universal Pictures lot because of their drunken behavior that frequently resulted in bloodshed.

Honors
In 1999, a Golden Palm Star on the Palm Springs, California, Walk of Stars was dedicated to him.

Death
Chaney suffered from a series of illnesses in the year prior to his death. In April 1973, he was released from the hospital after undergoing surgery for cataracts and treatment for beriberi. He also suffered from liver problems and gout. Chaney died on July 12, 1973, in San Clemente, California, at the age of 67. His cause of death was not immediately released to the public. Chaney's death certificate listed his cause of death as cardiac failure due to arteriosclerotic heart disease and cardiomyopathy.

He was honored by appearing as the Wolf Man on one of a 1997 series of United States postage stamps depicting movie monsters (his father appeared as the Phantom of the Opera, while Bela Lugosi appeared as Dracula, and Boris Karloff had two stamps as Frankenstein's monster and the original Mummy). His grandson Ron Chaney Jr. has appeared frequently as a guest at horror movie conventions.

Filmography
This is a list of known Lon Chaney Jr. theatrical films. Television appearances are listed separately.

Selected television appearances

 Versatile Varieties (1949–1950)
 I Love Lucy as a poker player friend of Ricky and Fred.  "Be a Pal" episode (1951)
 The Red Skelton Show, five episodes (1954–1959)
 Studio 57 as Jubal Pickett in "The Ballad of Jubal Pickett" (1955)
 Telephone Time as Jules Samenian in "The Golden Junkman"
 Hawkeye and the Last of the Mohicans (1957)   Chaney was a regular on this television series, portraying the role of Chingachgook
 Along the Mohawk Trail (1957)
 The Redmen and the Renegades (1957)
 The Pathfinder and the Mohican (1957)
 Tombstone Territory as Marshal Daggett in "The Black Marshal from Deadwood" (1958)
 Rawhide as Jesse Childress in "Incident on the Edge of Madness" (1959) and as Rock in "Incident at Spider Rock" (1963)
 The Texan as Wylie Ames in "No Love Wasted" (1959)
 General Electric Theater as Bucknell in "The Family Man" (1959)
 13 Demon Street, host of horror anthology series (1959)
 Border Patrol as a racketeer in "The Homecoming" (1959)
 Wanted: Dead or Alive as Sheriff Lon Paulson in "The Empty Cell" (1959)
 The Rough Riders as Ben "Pa" Hawkins in "An Eye for an Eye" (1959)
 Have Gun – Will Travel, two episodes, 1959 and 1963
 Johnny Ringo as Ben Rafferty in "The Raffertys" (1960)
 Lock-Up one episode
 Wagon Train, two episodes (1960–1961)
 Bat Masterson as Rance Fletcher in "Bat Trap" (1961)
 The Deputy as Tom Arnold in "Brother in Arms" (1961)
 Klondike as Macfin in "The Hostages" (1961)
 Stagecoach West as Ben Wait in "Not in Our Stars" (1961)
 Dick Powell's Zane Grey Theater as Michael Peters in "A Warm Day in Heaven" (1961)
 Surfside 6 as Tank Grosch in "Witness for the Defense" (1961)
 Route 66, three episodes (1961–1963)
 Lawman as Jess Bridges in "The Tarnished Badge" (1962)
 The Rifleman as Charlie Gordo in "Gunfire" (1962)
 Empire as Bart Howe in "Hidden Asset" (1963)
 Pistols 'n' Petticoats as Chief Eagle Shadow, four episodes (1966–1967)
 The Monkees as Lenny in "Monkees in a Ghost Town" (1966)

Select radio credits
 Inner Sanctum – "Ring of Doom" (1943)
 The Abbott and Costello Show (June 2, 1948)

References

Biography
 Lon Chaney Jr, Horror Film Star, 1906–1973 (1996)

External links

 Official website from Chaney Entertainment
 
 
 Lon Chaney Jr. Informative Biograph
 Chaney Jr. Applications of Make-Up Through the 1940s–1960s
 Additional Information on Chaney's Career
 Chaney, Lon Jr. Encyclopedia of Oklahoma History and Culture

1906 births
1973 deaths
American male film actors
Male actors from Oklahoma City
Deaths from cirrhosis
20th-century American male actors
20th Century Studios contract players
Universal Pictures contract players